This is a list of electroclash bands and artists.

A-K

Add N to (X)
Adult.
A.R.E. Weapons
Alice in Videoland
Alter Ego
Amanda Blank
Avenue D
The Blow
Cansei de Ser Sexy
Cazwell
Cherry Bikini
Chicks on Speed
Chris Korda
Client
Cobra Killer
Collider
Crystal Castles
Cursor Miner
Die Antwoord
Digitalism
Dirty Sanchez
DJ Hell
Electrocute
Electrosexual
Ellen Allien
Felix da Housecat
Fischerspooner
Freezepop
Fred Falke
Futurecop!
Gang Gang Dance
Gil Mantera's Party Dream
Golden Boy
Grum
Goldfrapp
Hot Chip
I-F
IAMX
Justice
Kap Bambino

L-Z

Ladytron
Larry Tee
Leif
Lesbians on Ecstasy
Le Tigre
Linda Lamb
Lindstrøm
Lolly Pop
Maria Daniela y su Sonido Lasser
Miami Horror
Midnight Juggernauts
Miss Kittin
Mount Sims
Namosh
Peaches
Phiiliip
Ping Pong Bitches
The Presets
Princess Superstar
Robots in Disguise
Röyksopp
Scissor Sisters (early songs)
Shiny Toy Guns
Sohodolls (early songs)
Soviet (band)
Spalding Rockwell
Spank Rock
The Faint
The Hacker
The Laws
The Scientists of Modern Music
The Whip
Tiga
Terry Poison
Tying Tiffany
Vitalic

References 

 
Electroclash